The Alive/Worldwide Tour (also known as the Reunion Tour) was a concert tour by American heavy metal band Kiss which began on June 28, 1996 in Detroit, United States and concluded on July 5, 1997 in London, England. It was the first tour with original members Peter Criss and Ace Frehley since the Dynasty Tour in 1979.

Background

While Kiss continued to exist publicly as Simmons, Stanley, Kulick and Singer, arrangements for a reunion of the original lineup were in the works. These efforts culminated with a public event as dramatic as any the band had staged since its 1983 unmasking on MTV. With those statements, Tupac Shakur introduced the original Kiss lineup, in full makeup and Love Gun-era stage outfits, to a rousing ovation at the 38th Annual Grammy Awards on February 28, 1996:

The conference, MC'd by Conan O'Brien, was simulcast to 58 countries. On April 20, nearly 40,000 tickets for the tour's first show sold out in 47 minutes. The band would bring back their vintage stunts, including Simmons' blood-spitting and fire-breathing, Frehley's smoking and shooting guitar, pyrotechnics and platform risers.

The members worked out to physical shape for the tour, with Frehley going for plastic surgery, as Stanley stated that they 'did not want people to be disappointed when they saw a bunch of fat guys in tights'.

Following rehearsals, Kiss began their reunion tour on June 15, 1996 with a warmup gig in Irvine, California for the KROQ Weenie Roast. It was considered by the band to be a live rehearsal for many aspects of the stage show before the tour was set to begin at a sold out Tiger Stadium in Detroit on June 28, 1996, playing to approximately 40,000 people. The tour lasted for 192 shows over the course of one year and earned $43.6 million, making Kiss the top-drawing concert act of 1996. On April 5, 1997 during the band's show at the Columbus Civic Center, Criss was unable to perform, resulting in the band bringing in the drum technician Ed Kanon for that performance.

In the tour program for the band's final tour, Stanley reflected on the tour:

Reception
For the warmup performance at the KROQ "Weenie Roast", a reporter from the Los Angeles Times noted on the weak, stringy voice of Stanley, claiming that he was ill equipped for his operatic style that 'it's almost heroic for him to even try'. He noted that Kiss still looked and sounded like Kiss, noting on the teamwork that the band were sharing during the performance, concluding that both Criss and Frehley were now 'reconciled for fun and lots of profit'.

A reporter from Rolling Stone who attended the first show of the tour at Tiger Stadium in Detroit, stated: "Sure, Kiss suck, but give them a little credit - they've sucked for more than 20 years. Surviving has meant the band has lived long enough to see its influence on the next generation, which perhaps explains the shocking spectacle of Billy Corgan and Sebastian Bach bonding backstage. So, OK, maybe Kiss don't suck. And in their defense, it should be shouted out loud that they were one of the first bands to embrace fully the notion of rock as a show, thus putting them ahead of the curve that would soon bring us Cats and the re-emergence of Las Vegas as the new American capital."

From the final show in London at Finsbury Park, a reporter from The Independent stated: "As you'd expect with Kiss, it was one of the best stage entrances ever but, apart from a few moments, the gig soon sagged. They retained some interest through theatrics... the fact that all this was going on in daylight didn't help but when dusk fell, Kiss moved up several gears. Since it was the last night of a world tour that started over a year ago, sentimentality was a recurring theme. Singer and band spokesman Paul Stanley babbled on how important the Kiss Army were and how he'd like to get among them... If this was theatre, it was the theatre of the absurd, where the joke seemed to be on Kiss, until, finally, you realized that you'd had been laughing with them, not at them, all along."

Setlist
The following setlist was performed at the warmup show of the tour in Irvine, California and is not intended to represent all of the shows on tour.
"Deuce"
"Love Gun"
"Cold Gin"
"Calling Dr. Love"
"Firehouse"
"Shock Me"
"100,000 Years"
"Detroit Rock City"
"Black Diamond"
Encore
"Rock and Roll All Nite"

Tour dates

Postponed and cancelled dates

Box office score data

Personnel
 Paul Stanley – vocals, rhythm guitar
 Gene Simmons – vocals, bass
 Peter Criss – drums, vocals
 Ace Frehley – lead guitar, vocals
Additional musician
 Ed Kanon – drums, drum technician

References

Sources

Kiss (band) concert tours
1996 concert tours
1997 concert tours
Reunion concert tours